The Roman Catholic Archdiocese of Lilongwe is the Roman Catholic archdiocese located in Lilongwe in Malawi.  Before its elevation to an archdiocese in 2011, it had belonged to the ecclesiastical province of the Archdiocese of Blantyre. The Maula Cathedral is located in the town of Lilongwe.

Timeline

 July 31, 1889: Established as Apostolic Prefecture of Nyassa from the Apostolic Vicariate of Tanganyika in Tanzania 
 February 12, 1897: Promoted as Apostolic Vicariate of Nyassa 
 July 12, 1951: Renamed as Apostolic Vicariate of Likuni 
 June 20, 1958: Renamed as Apostolic Vicariate of Lilongwe
 April 25, 1959: Promoted as Diocese of Lilongwe
 February 9, 2011: Elevated to Archdiocese of Lilongwe

Bishops
 Vicars Apostolic of Nyassa (Roman rite) 
 Bishop Joseph-Marie-Stanislas Dupont, M. Afr. (1897.02.12 – 1911.02.28)
 Bishop Mathurin Guillemé, M. Afr. (1911.02.24 – 1934.06.27)
 Bishop Joseph Ansgarius Julien, M. Afr. (1934.12.10 – 1950.12.07)
 Vicar Apostolic of Likuni (Roman rite)
 Bishop Joseph Fady, M. Afr. (1951.07.10 – 1958.06.20 see below)
 Vicar Apostolic of Lilongwe (Roman rite) 
 Bishop Joseph Fady, M. Afr. (see above 1958.06.20 – 1959.04.25 see below)
Bishops of Lilongwe (Roman rite)
Bishop Joseph Fady, M. Afr. (see above 1959.04.25 – 1972.05.06)
Bishop Patrick Augustine Kalilombe, M. Afr. (1972.05.06 – 1979.12.20)
Bishop Matthias A. Chimole (1979.12.20 – 1994.11.11)
Bishop Tarcisius Gervazio Ziyaye (1994.11.11 – 2001.01.23), appointed Archbishop of Blantyre; later returned here as Archbishop
Bishop Felix Eugenio Mkhori (2001.01.23 – 2007.07.04)
Bishop Rémi Joseph Gustave Sainte-Marie, M. Afr. (2007.07.04 - 2011.02.09 see below)
Archbishops of Lilongwe (Roman rite)
Archbishop Rémi Joseph Gustave Sainte-Marie, M. Afr. (see above'' 2011.02.09 - 2013.07.03)
Archbishop Tarcisius Gervazio Ziyaye (2013.07.03 – 2020.12.14); was previously here as Bishop
Archbishop George Desmond Tambala, O.C.D. (since 2021.10.15)

Coadjutor Bishops
Rémi Joseph Gustave Sainte-Marie, M. Afr. (2006-2007)
Tarcisius Gervazio Ziyaye (1993-1994)

Auxiliary Bishop
Stanislaus Tobias Magombo (2009-2010)

Suffragan dioceses
Its suffragan dioceses are:

Dedza
Karonga
Mzuzu

Sources

GCatholic.org

Roman Catholic dioceses in Malawi
Religious organizations established in 1889
Roman Catholic dioceses and prelatures established in the 19th century
1889 establishments in Africa
A